Albert C. Nash (1825-1890) was an American architect best known for his work in Milwaukee and Cincinnati.

Life and career
Albert Cone Nash was born December 10, 1825, in New York City to Burr Nash and Mary (Oatman) Nash. In 1832 the family moved to New Haven, Connecticut, where Nash was educated and was trained in architecture. The leading architects in New Haven at the time were Henry Austin and Sidney Mason Stone, but it is not documented if he worked for either. In 1848 he established himself as an architect in Bridgeport, where he practiced for eight years. In 1856 he moved west to Milwaukee. In 1867, having been awarded the commission to design the new Cincinnati Hospital, he relocated to Cincinnati. He continued to live and work in Cincinnati until his death in 1890.

The notable Connecticut architects Rufus W. Bunnell, Robert W. Hill and Edward R. Lambert all received training in Nash's office, and he was a mentor to many young Cincinnati architects.

Nash was a founding member of the Cincinnati chapter of the American Institute of Architects in 1870. He served twice as the group's president, from 1873 to 1877 and 1882 to 1885.

Personal life
Nash married in 1851 to Henrietta B. Tucker of New Haven. He had at least one son, M. R. Nash, who was also an architect and succeeded to his father's practice after his death. The younger Nash was born in Milwaukee, and began working for his father in 1879. After two years of private practice Nash formed a partnership with Lucien F. Plympton circa 1892. Nash & Plympton practiced together until at least 1895.

Albert C. Nash died July 15, 1890, at home in Walnut Hills.

Projects
 Trinity Episcopal Church, Southport, Connecticut (1854–56, destroyed and rebuilt 1862)
 Greenfield Hill Congregational Church, Fairfield, Connecticut (1855, altered)
 House for James H. Rogers, Milwaukee, Wisconsin (1856–57, demolished)
 Bank of Milwaukee Building, Milwaukee, Wisconsin (1858–59, altered 1903, NRHP 1984)
 Additions to the Wisconsin School for the Deaf, Delavan, Wisconsin (1866–67, demolished)
 "Holmesdale" for Daniel Henry Holmes, Covington, Kentucky (1866–67, demolished 1936)
 Cincinnati Hospital, Cincinnati, Ohio (1867–69, demolished)
 House for Elias Howe Jr., Bridgeport, Connecticut (circa 1867, not built)
 House for Anthony H. Hinkle, Mount Auburn, Cincinnati, Ohio (1868, demolished)
 Mound Street Temple, Cincinnati, Ohio (1868–69, demolished)
 Central Christian Church, Cincinnati, Ohio (1869–72, demolished)
 Bourbon County Courthouse, Paris, Kentucky (1873–74, burned 1901)
 First Presbyterian Church, Glendale, Ohio (1873)
 Trinity Episcopal Church, Parkersburg, West Virginia (1878–79, NRHP 1982)
 Parish hall of Grace Church (former), Cincinnati, Ohio (1880, NRHP 1982)
 Dueber Watch Case Manufacturing Company factories, Newport, Kentucky (1882–83 and 1886)
 St. Clair Hotel, Cincinnati, Ohio (1882, demolished)
 Wyoming Baptist Church, Wyoming, Ohio (1882)
 Campbell County Courthouse, Newport, Kentucky (1883–84, NRHP 1988)
 Latonia Race Track, Covington, Kentucky (1883, demolished)
 Sisters of Charity of Cincinnati motherhouse, Mount Saint Joseph, Ohio (1883)
 Masonic Building, Ludlow, Kentucky (1884)
 R. C. Church of the Assumption (former), Cincinnati, Ohio (1884–85)
 Walnut Hills Christian Church, Cincinnati, Ohio (1884, demolished)
 Hoffner Building, Cincinnati, Ohio (1885)
 Walnut Hills Baptist Church, Cincinnati, Ohio (1885, demolished)
 Fort Washington Hotel, Cincinnati, Ohio (1887)
 Westminster Presbyterian Church, Cincinnati, Ohio (1888, demolished)
 St. Nicholas Hotel annex, Cincinnati, Ohio (1890, demolished)
 Carlisle Building, Cincinnati, Ohio (no date, demolished)

Gallery of architectural works

Notes

References

Architects from Bridgeport, Connecticut
Architects from Cincinnati
Architects from Milwaukee
1825 births
1890 deaths
19th-century American architects